The 1997 Nevada Wolf Pack football team represented the University of Nevada, Reno during the 1997 NCAA Division I-A football season. Nevada competed as a member of the Big West Conference (BWC). The Wolf Pack were led by second–year head coach Jeff Tisdel and played their home games at Mackay Stadium.

Schedule

References

Nevada
Nevada Wolf Pack football seasons
Big West Conference football champion seasons
Nevada Wolf Pack football